Mancınık Castle is a Hellenistic castle ruin in Mersin Province, Turkey. Its original name is unknown.

Geography

Visitors to the site follow the road from  Narlıkuyu and Cennet to north . The last  of the course which detaches from the road to east is actually a rough path. The castle is situated on the clift which overviews the Şeytanderesi canyon to the east. Adamkayalar (which is historically unrelated to the castle) is situated 7 km southeast in the east wall of the canyon.

History
The first archaeological research of the site has been carried out by Levent Zoroğlu in 1987. The  walls are made of polygonal shaped stones, a characteristics of Hellenistic architecture. Also there are few inscriptions. Although these are mostly erased a few words could be read. Hellenistic origin is also confirmed by a decrypted word oikodomos.

References

Silifke District
Hellenistic architecture
Ancient Greek archaeological sites in Turkey
Ruined castles in Turkey
Castles in Turkey
Castles in Mersin Province
Archaeological sites in Mersin Province, Turkey